Biramitrapur is a Vidhan Sabha constituency of Sundergarh district, Odisha.
Area of this constituency includes Biramitrapur, Kuarmunda block, Nuagaon block and part of Bisra block.

Elected Members

Eleven elections held during 1974 to 2019. List of members elected from Biramitrapur constituency are:
2019: (10): Shankar Oram  (BJP)
2014: (10): George Tirkey (SKD)
2009: (10): George Tirkey (Independent)
2004: (138): Nihar Surin (JMM)
2000: (138): George Tirkey (JMM)
1995: (138): George Tirkey (JMM)
1990: (138): Satya Narayan Pradhan (Janata Dal)
1985: (138): Remis Kerketa (Congress)
1980: (138): Junas Bilung (Congress-I)
1977: (138): Prem Chand Bhagat (Janata Party)
1974: (138): Christodas Lugun (Independent)

2019 Election Result
In 2019 election Bharatiya Janata Party candidate Shankar Oram, defeated Biju Janata Dal candidate Makhlu Ekka by a margin of 16,351 votes.

2014 Election Result
In 2014 election Samata Kranti Dal candidate George Tirkey, defeated Bharatiya Janata Party candidate Shankar Oram by a margin of 11,947 votes.

2009 Election Result
In 2009 election Independent candidate George Tirkey, defeated Jharkhand Mukti Morcha candidate Nihar Soren by a margin of 20,811 votes.

Notes

References

Sundergarh district
Assembly constituencies of Odisha